The Spyder Victor is a series of semi-automatic paintball markers manufactured by SDS. Its simple stacked tube blowback operation allows it to run on both CO2 or HPA (High Pressure Air)..

External links
Kingman Website

Paintball markers